Sergiy Stakhovsky was the defending champion but lost in the quarterfinals to Constant Lestienne.

Lestienne won the title after defeating Andrea Arnaboldi 6–2, 6–1 in the final.

Seeds

Draw

Finals

Top half

Bottom half

References
Main Draw
Qualifying Draw

Tilia Slovenia Open - Singles
2018 Singles